The Commonhold and Leasehold Reform Act 2002 (c.15) is an Act of the Parliament of the United Kingdom.  It introduced commonhold, a new way of owning land similar to the Australian strata title or the American condominium, into English and Welsh law. Part 1 deals with commonhold and part 2 deals with leasehold reform. Some supplementary material is covered in part 3.

Commonholds were introduced to deal with the perceived unfairness of the existing leasehold system, and England and Wales being unique in not offering a legal option for ownership of common areas of shared buildings. Commonhold ownership has not become popular, and in 2018 the Law Commission launched a consultation into ways to expand usage of commonhold estates.

See also
Leasehold estate
Leasehold Reform Act 1967
Leasehold valuation tribunal

References

External links
Records of Parliamentary debate relating to the Act from Hansard, at theyworkforyou.com

English property law
United Kingdom Acts of Parliament 2002
Housing legislation in the United Kingdom
Condominium